Etton is a village and civil parish in the East Riding of Yorkshire, England. To the west lie the hamlets of Kiplingcotes ( away due west) and Gardham ( to the south-west). South Dalton lies 1.5 miles to the north-west.

The village itself lies to the west of the B1248 road in its own shallow dale. The village's buildings are almost entirely situated either side of Main Street. Along this street lie both the village pub and the parish church of St Mary, which is a Grade II* listed building.

The civil parish is formed by the village of Etton and part of the hamlet of Kiplingcotes.
According to the 2011 UK Census, Etton parish had a population of 277, a decrease on the 2001 UK Census figure of 285.

Etton is significant as the 1584 birthplace of Rev John Lothropp, founder of Barnstable, Massachusetts. Several Lothropp family members have death or burial dates recorded as 6 January 1588, but as there is no record of a catastrophic event on that date, it is believed to be merely a recording date to catch up on vital statistics which had gone unreported for some length of time.

Thomas Carling, who emigrated from Etton to Canada in 1818, used 'a recipe from his native Yorkshire' to found the Carling Brewery in 1840.

Etton is also home to the Holderness Hunt, whose kennels are located on the south-east of the village.

In 1823 Etton was in the Wapentake of Harthill. The village had a population of 380, with occupations including nine farmers, two shopkeepers, a carpenter & wheelwright, a boot & shoe maker, a tailor, a corn miller, and the landlord of the Light Dragoon public house. There were two gentlemen, one gentlewoman, a Lady, a vicar, and a schoolmaster who was also the parish clerk. Once a week two carriers operated between the village and Beverley. The patron of the village Church of St Mary was the Archbishop of York.

Etton has been known to suffer quite badly during floods, due to its position in a small valley, with the most recent flood on 25 June 2007.

References

External links

Villages in the East Riding of Yorkshire
Civil parishes in the East Riding of Yorkshire